Aqmola may refer to:

Aqmola Oblast (Russian Empire)
Akmola Region, or Aqmola Region, a province of Kazakhstan
Astana, known as Aqmola until 1994, the capital of Kazakhstan